Sankt Anton am Arlberg, commonly referred to as St Anton, is a village and ski resort in the Austrian state of Tyrol. It is also a popular summer resort among hikers, trekkers and mountaineers.

Skiing has a long history in St. Anton: ski instructors from the area emigrated to the United States in the 1930s, helping to popularise the sport. St. Anton was the host of the Alpine World Ski Championships in 2001, and is frequently listed as one of the world's top skiing resorts both in terms of skiing available and après-ski entertainment.

Geography 

St Anton lies on the Rosanna River and is in the main east-west rail line between Austria and Switzerland. There are many airports that serve St Anton by way of train and car that include Munich, Zürich, Innsbruck, and Friedrichshafen. The centre is a pedestrian zone.

Activities

Skiing 

On the western edge of village is the "Galzigbahn" which has been replaced by a Funitel gondola. The new gondola includes a first-ever "Ferris wheel": enabling passengers to board the gondolas on ground level, then rotating the gondolas up to the main high-speed cables. The Funitel accesses the Galzig slopes and connects to Schindler and Valluga peaks. On the eastern edge of town, the Nassereinbahn rises to the Nasserein area with connections to the Kapall peak. The Kapall, Valluga, and Schindler peaks provide skiers with close to 1,500 vertical metres skiing. Slope-side après-ski bars can be found on the Steissbachtal trail just above St Anton.

The groomed runs in the region cater to all levels; 43% are for beginners (blue), 41% for intermediate skiers (red) and 16% are for the more advanced (black). There are also  of deep snow runs in the area.

Expert terrain includes less-frequently groomed ski routes such as Schindlerkar and Mattun, and the backside of Valluga down to Zürs, which is for experts only if accompanied by a guide. There are also a large number of off-piste routes in the area that experts can explore with the help of a guide.

Other ski areas are St Christoph am Arlberg, a hamlet where in the 14th century the shepherd Heinrich Findelkind built a hospice as a shelter for travellers crossing the Arlberg pass to the Vorarlberg province, Stuben, Lech, Zürs, Warth-Schröcken and Klösterle/Sonnenkopf.

Transportation 

St Anton is easily reached by car on the A14 motorway, which runs from Vorarlberg (Austria's westernmost state, which borders Liechtenstein and Switzerland) and then follows the spine of the Tyrol. 

Alternatively, St Anton, Langen am Arlberg, and Kloesterle (all located in the Arlberg ski region) have railway stations. Both St Anton and Langen am Arlberg are stops on international train services between Zurich and Budapest.

St Anton and the surrounding villages/resorts are served by a network of bus routes. In the town itself, there are two hubs known as the "Terminal Ost" and the "Terminal West". "Terminal Ost" gives access to the Nassereinbahn Gondola and the "Terminal West" to the Galzigbahn/ Rendlbahn gondolas as well as the town's railway station. 

There is a route with frequent, year-round services between St Anton and Landeck, the latter being a town located at the entrance to the main valley (Stanzertal, as it is known in the local area). Frequent free bus services also operate between different parts of St Anton as well as from Pettneu, Schnann, and Flirsch.

Climate

In popular culture 

The resort was featured extensively in the 2011 film Chalet Girl, a romantic comedy starring Felicity Jones, Ed Westwick and Bill Nighy. The resort of Garmisch-Partenkirchen in Germany was also used for some interior shots.

Was the site used for the 1995 music video “Light Years” for Jamiroquai’s fourth  single from their sophomore album “The Return Of The Space Cowboy”. 

St. Anton was shown in the 1969 film Downhill Racer, starring Robert Redford and Gene Hackman.

St. Anton was also the setting for the film The White Ecstasy, starring Leni Riefenstahl and local ski instructor Hannes Schneider. Made in 1931, the comedy film was a fictional account of the skiing exploits of a young village girl, played by Riefenstahl, and her attempts to master the sport of skiing and ski-jumping aided by the local ski expert Hannes Schneider. The film was one of the first to use and develop outdoor film-making techniques and featured several innovative action-skiing scenes. Riefenstahl went on to make Nazi propaganda films and, post-war, subsequently lived in Africa. After the war, Schneider developed the downhill skiing method known as the "Arlberg technique".

Statistics 

 Elevation: village: ; top: .
 Vertical: .
 Longest run: , Valluga to St. Anton.
 Lifts: 94 (Ski*Arlberg); 11 gondolas; 51 chairlifts (one 10-passenger, one 8-passenger, fifteen 6-passenger, 15 quads, 1 triples, 18 doubles); 32 T-bars lifts.
 Lift capacity: 151,010 per hour.
 Ski season: early December to late April.
 Cross country:  total: Stanzertal , Verwall , St Christoph , Ganderau , Reit , Pofel 
 Mountain restaurants: 18.
 Après-ski: ski museum; 15 cafés, 8 ice bars, 3 discos, 7 bars.
 Lodging: 8,900 beds; hotels, gasthof, apartments, private pensions in St. Anton, St Jakob and St Christoph.

References 

 Sources
 Chris Gill and Dave Watts, Where to Ski and Snowboard 2007, .
 John Darrell Sherwood, "Going Further Afield: St. Anton, Austria", 23 February 2003
 Ski-Europe article on St. Anton.
 Jacqueline McGibbon, The Business of Alpine Tourism in a Globalising World – an anthropological study of international tourism in the village of St. Anton am Arlberg in the Tirolean Alps.

External links 

 
 Arlberger Bergbahnen AG (cable car company)
 Weather, webcams, videos, etc. from Sankt Anton am Arlberg

Cities and towns in Landeck District
Ski areas and resorts in Austria
Verwall Alps